Miss Elva is the eleventh studio album by Taiwanese singer Elva Hsiao, released on 24 September 2010 by Gold Typhoon. The songs, "Wrong Man", "Miss Elva", and "Rhapsody", reached number four, twenty-five, and sixty-five respectively on Hit FM Annual Top 100 Singles in 2010.

Track listing

References

External Links
 

2010 albums
Elva Hsiao albums
Gold Typhoon Taiwan albums